The Deserted Station (Persian: Istgah-e Matrouk) is a 2002 film by the Iranian director Alireza Raisian. It was scripted by Kambuzia Partovi (based on a story by Abbas Kiarostami) and lensed by Mohammad Aladpoush. The film starred Leila Hatami, Nezam Manouchehri and Mehran Rajabi in the principal roles. Hatami won the Best Actress prize at the Montréal World Film Festival for her performance (co-winner with Maria Bonnevie).

References

Iranian drama films
Persian-language films
2003 films